Edwardiella is a genus of fungi within the family Lichinaceae. This is a monotypic genus, containing the single species Edwardiella mirabilis. Aino Henssen named the genus after the Prince Edward Islands, the type locality of the type species.

References

External links
Index Fungorum

Lichinomycetes
Lichen genera
Monotypic Ascomycota genera
Taxa named by Aino Henssen
Taxa described in 1986